The 2005 United Kingdom general election was held on Thursday 5 May 2005, to elect 646 members to the House of Commons. The Labour Party, led by Tony Blair, won its third consecutive victory, with Blair becoming the second Labour leader after Harold Wilson to form three majority governments. However, its majority fell to 66 seats compared to the 167-seat majority it had won four years before. This was the first time the Labour Party had won a third consecutive election, and remains the party's most recent general election victory.

The Labour campaign emphasised a strong economy; however, Blair had suffered a decline in popularity, which was exacerbated by the decision to send British troops to invade Iraq in 2003. Despite this, Labour mostly retained its leads over the Conservatives in opinion polls on economic competence and leadership, and Conservative leaders Iain Duncan Smith (2001–2003) and Michael Howard (2003–2005) struggled to capitalise on Blair's unpopularity, with the party consistently trailing behind Labour in the polls throughout the 2001–2005 parliament.

The Conservatives campaigned on policies such as immigration limits, improving poorly managed hospitals, and reducing high crime rates. The Liberal Democrats, led by Charles Kennedy, were opposed to the Iraq War, given that there had been no second UN resolution, and collected votes from disenchanted Labour voters.

Tony Blair was returned as Prime Minister, with Labour having 355 MPs, but with a popular vote share of 35.2%, the smallest of any majority government in UK electoral history. In terms of votes, it was only narrowly ahead of the Conservatives, but still had a comfortable lead in terms of seats. The Conservatives returned 198 MPs, with 32 more seats than they had won at the previous general election, and won the popular vote in England, while still ending up with 91 fewer MPs in England than Labour. The Liberal Democrats saw their popular vote increase by 3.7% and won the most seats of any third party since 1923, with 62 MPs. Anti-war activist and former Labour MP George Galloway was elected as the MP for Bethnal Green and Bow under the Respect – The Unity Coalition banner, unseating Oona King; Richard Taylor was re-elected for Kidderminster Health Concern in Wyre Forest; and independent candidate Peter Law was elected in Blaenau Gwent.

This would be to date the last general election to be held where the winning political party would win a majority of the seats that were contested in all of the constituent countries of Great Britain (ie England, Scotland and Wales) at the same time.

In Northern Ireland, the Ulster Unionist Party, the more moderate of the main unionist parties, which had dominated Northern Irish politics since the 1920s, was reduced from six MPs to one, with party leader David Trimble himself being unseated. The more hardline Democratic Unionist Party became the largest Northern Irish party, with nine MPs elected.

Notable MPs leaving the House of Commons at this election included UUP leader David Trimble, former SDLP leader John Hume, former Cabinet ministers Estelle Morris, Paul Boateng, Chris Smith, Gillian Shephard, Virginia Bottomley and Michael Portillo, the Father of the House of Commons Tam Dalyell, Tony Banks and Sir Teddy Taylor, while Stephen Twigg lost his seat in Enfield Southgate back to the Conservatives.

Following the election, Michael Howard conceded defeat, resigned as Conservative leader and was succeeded by future Prime Minister David Cameron. Blair resigned as both Prime Minister and Leader of the Labour Party in June 2007, and was replaced by then-Chancellor of the Exchequer Gordon Brown. The election results were broadcast live on the BBC and presented by Peter Snow, David Dimbleby, Tony King, Jeremy Paxman, and Andrew Marr.

Overview

The governing Labour Party, led by Tony Blair, was looking to secure a third consecutive term in office and to retain a large majority. The Conservative Party was seeking to regain seats lost to both Labour and the Liberal Democrats since the 1992 general election, and move from being the Official Opposition into government. The Liberal Democrats hoped to make gains from both main parties, but especially the Conservative Party, with a "decapitation" strategy targeting members of the Shadow Cabinet. The Lib Dems had also wished to become the governing party, or to make enough gains to become the Official Opposition, but more realistically hoped to play a major part in a parliament led by a minority Labour or Conservative government. In Northern Ireland the Democratic Unionist Party sought to make further gains from the Ulster Unionist Party in unionist politics, and Sinn Féin hoped to overtake the Social Democratic and Labour Party in nationalist politics. (Note that Sinn Féin MPs do not take their seats in the House of Commons—they follow a policy of abstentionism.) The pro-independence Scottish National Party and Plaid Cymru (Party of Wales) stood candidates in every constituency in Scotland and Wales respectively.

Many seats were contested by other parties, including several parties without incumbents in the House of Commons. Parties that were not represented at Westminster, but had seats in the devolved assemblies and/or the European Parliament, included the Alliance Party of Northern Ireland, the UK Independence Party, the Green Party of England and Wales, the Scottish Green Party, and the Scottish Socialist Party. The Health Concern party also stood again. A full list of parties which declared their intention to run can be found on the list of parties contesting the 2005 general election.

All parties campaigned using such tools as party manifestos, party political broadcasts and touring the country in what are commonly referred to as battle buses.

Local elections in parts of England and in Northern Ireland were held on the same day. The polls were open for fifteen hours, from 07:00 to 22:00 BST (UTC+1). The election came just over three weeks after the dissolution of Parliament on 11 April by Queen Elizabeth II, at the request of the Prime Minister, Tony Blair.

Campaign

Following the death of Pope John Paul II on 2 April, it was announced that the calling of the election would be delayed until 5 April.

Thanks to eight years of sustained economic growth Labour could point to a strong economy, with greater investment in public services such as education and health. This was overshadowed, however, by the issue of the controversial 2003 invasion of Iraq, which met widespread public criticism at the time, and would dog Blair throughout the campaign. The Chancellor, Gordon Brown, played a prominent role in the election campaign, frequently appearing with Blair and ensuring that the economy would remain the central focus of Labour's message.

Recently elected Conservative leader Michael Howard brought a great level of experience and stability to a party that had ousted its former leader Iain Duncan Smith just 18 months prior. The Conservative campaign was managed by Australian strategist Lynton Crosby. The campaign focused on more traditional conservative issues like immigration, which created some controversy with the slogan "It's not racist to impose limits on immigration". They also criticised Labour's "dirty" hospitals and high crime levels, under the umbrella of the slogan "Are you thinking what we're thinking?"

However, Labour counter-attacked, by emphasising Howard's role in the unpopular Major Government of 1992–1997, airing a party election broadcast attacking Howard, showing a montage of scenes from Howard's tenure as Home Secretary, including prison riots and home repossessions. It also launched a billboard campaign showing Howard, and the Conservative Party's four previous leaders (Iain Duncan Smith, William Hague, John Major and Margaret Thatcher), with the caption "Britain's working, don't let the Tories wreck it again."

For the Liberal Democrats, this was the second and final election campaign fought by leader Charles Kennedy, who strongly opposed the Iraq War and personally offered a more down-to-earth approach to voters, which proved popular. There were some questions, however, over Kennedy's abilities when, at the Liberal Democrat manifesto launch, he was asked about local income tax, but appeared confused on the figures. Both the Liberal Democrats and the Conservatives were keen to tackle Labour's introduction of tuition fees, which both opposition parties opposed and promised to abolish.

Ballot

At the close of voting (2200 BST) the ballot boxes were sealed and returned to the counting centres, where counting proceeded under the supervision of the returning officer who was obliged to declare the result as soon as it was known. As previously, there was serious competition amongst constituencies to be first to declare. Sunderland South repeated its performance in the last three elections and declared Labour incumbent Chris Mullin re-elected as MP with a majority of 11,059 at approximately 2245 BST (failing by two minutes to beat its previous best, but making it eligible for entry into the Guinness Book of World Records as longest consecutive delivery of first results). The vote itself represented a swing (in a safe Labour seat, in a safe Labour region) of about 4% to the Conservatives and 4.5% to the Liberal Democrats, somewhat below the prediction of BBC/ITV exit polls published shortly after 2200 BST.

Sunderland North was the next to declare, followed by Houghton and Washington East, both of whose Labour MPs retained their seats but with reductions in the incumbent majorities of up to 9%. The first Scottish seat to declare was Rutherglen and Hamilton West — another safe Labour seat, also a Labour hold, but with the majority reduced by 4%. The first seat to change hands was Putney, where Labour's majority of 2,771 fell to a strong Conservative challenge, with a total swing of about 5,000 (6.2%). This was also the first seat to be declared for the Conservatives. The first Liberal Democrat seat to be declared was North East Fife, the constituency of Lib Dem deputy leader Sir Menzies Campbell which he had held since 1987.

The constituency of Crawley in West Sussex had the slimmest majority of any seat, with Labour's Laura Moffatt holding off the Conservatives' Henry Smith by 37 votes after three recounts.

Polling

Following problems with exit polls in previous British elections, the BBC and ITV agreed for the first time to pool their respective data, using results from Mori and NOP. More than 20,000 people were interviewed for the poll at 120 polling stations across the country. The predictions were very accurate—initial projections saw Labour returned to power with a majority of 66 (down from 160), and the final result (including South Staffordshire, where the election was postponed due to the death of a candidate) was indeed a Labour majority of 66.

The projected shares of the vote in Great Britain were Labour 35% (down 6% on 2001), Conservatives 33% (up 1%), Liberal Democrats 22% (up 4%) and other parties 8% (up 1%). The Conservatives were expected to make the biggest gains, however — 44 seats according to the exit poll — with the Liberal Democrats expected to take as few as two. Whilst the Lib Dems' vote share predicted by the exit poll was accurate (22.6% compared to the actual 22.0%), they did better in some Lib Dem-Labour marginals than predicted on the basis of the national share of the vote, and achieved a net gain of 11 seats.

2001 notional result
There were major boundary changes in Scotland, where the number of seats were reduced from 72 to 59. As a result of this each party lost some seats, and this notional election result below is based on the 2001 election results if they had been fought on these new 2005 boundaries.

Results

At 04:28 BST, it was announced that Labour had won Corby, giving them 324 seats in the House of Commons out of those then declared and an overall majority, Labour's total reaching 355 seats out of the 646 House of Commons seats. Labour received 35.3% of the popular vote, equating to approximately 22% of the electorate on a 61.3% turnout, up from 59.4% turnout in 2001.

As expected, voter disenchantment led to an increase of support for many opposition parties, and caused many eligible to vote, not to turn out. Labour achieved a third successive term in office for the first time in their history, though with reduction of the Labour majority from 167 to 67 (as it was before the declaration of South Staffordshire). As it became clear that Labour had won an overall majority, Michael Howard, the leader of the Conservative Party, announced his intention to retire from frontline politics. The final seat to declare was the delayed poll in South Staffordshire, at just after 1 a.m. on Friday 24 June.

The election was followed by further criticism of the UK electoral system. Calls for reform came particularly from Lib Dem supporters, citing that they received only just over 10% of the overall seats with 22.1% of the popular vote. The only parties to win a substantially higher percentage of seats than they achieved in votes were Labour, the Democratic Unionist Party, Sinn Féin, and Health Concern, which ran only one candidate. The results of the election give a Gallagher index of dis-proportionality of 16.76.

The Labour Government claimed that being returned to office for a third term for the first time ever showed the public approval of Labour's governance and the continued unpopularity of the Conservatives. Nevertheless, Labour's vote declined to 35.3%, the lowest share of the popular vote to have formed a majority government in the history of the UK House of Commons. In many areas the collapse in the Labour vote resulted in a host of seats changing hands. Labour also failed to gain any new seats, almost unique in any election since 1945. As well as losing seats to the Tories and the Liberal Democrats, Labour also lost Blaenau Gwent, its safest seat in Wales, to Independent Peter Law, and Bethnal Green and Bow to Respect candidate George Galloway.

The Conservatives claimed that their increased number of seats showed disenchantment with the Labour government and was a precursor of a Conservative breakthrough at the next election. Following three consecutive elections of declining representation and then in 2001 a net gain of just one seat, 2005 was the first general election since their famous 1983 landslide victory where the number of Conservative seats increased appreciably, although the Conservatives' vote share increased only slightly and this election did mark the third successive general election in which the Conservatives polled below 35%. In some areas the Conservative vote actually fell. The Conservatives claimed to have won the general election in England, since they received more votes than Labour although Labour still won a majority of seats.

The Liberal Democrats claimed that their continued gradual increase in seats and percentage vote showed they were in a position to make further gains from both parties. They pointed in particular to the fact that they were now in second place in roughly one hundred and ninety constituencies and that having had net losses to Labour in the 1992 general election and having not taken a single seat off Labour in 1997, they had held their gains off Labour from the 2001 general election and had actually made further gains from them. The Liberal Democrats also managed to take three seats from the Conservatives, one notable victory being that of Tim Farron over Tim Collins in Westmorland and Lonsdale, through the use of a "decapitation strategy", which targeted senior Tories.

The Liberal Democrats increased their percentage of the vote by 3.7%, the Conservatives by 0.6%, and Labour's dropped by 5.4%.

The UK media interpreted the results as an indicator of a breakdown in trust in the government, and especially in Prime Minister Tony Blair.

Meanwhile, the Scottish National Party improved its position in Scotland, regaining the Western Isles and Dundee East from Labour, having lost both seats in 1987. In Wales Plaid Cymru failed to gain any seats and lost Ceredigion to the Liberal Democrats. In Northern Ireland the Ulster Unionists were all but wiped out, only keeping North Down, with leader David Trimble losing his seat in Upper Bann. For the first time the DUP became the biggest party in Northern Ireland.

It was the first general election since 1929 in which no party received more than ten million votes. It was the most "three-cornered" election since 1923, though the Liberal Democrats failed to match the higher national votes of the SDP–Liberal Alliance in the 1980s either in absolute or percentage terms. The total combined vote for Labour, the Conservatives and the Liberal Democrats proved to be the lowest main three-party vote since 1922.

The figure of 355 seats for Labour does not include the Speaker Michael Martin. 
See also the list of parties standing in Northern Ireland.

Seats changing hands

MPs who lost their seats

Seats which changed allegiance 

Labour to Conservative (31)

 Bexleyheath and Crayford
 Braintree
 Croydon Central
 Dumfriesshire, Clydesdale and Tweeddale
 Enfield Southgate
 Forest of Dean
 Gravesham
 Hammersmith and Fulham
 Harwich
 Hemel Hempstead
 Hornchurch
 Ilford North
 Kettering
 Lancaster and Wyre
 Monmouth
 North East Milton Keynes
 Northampton South
 Peterborough
 Preseli Pembrokeshire
 Putney
 Reading East
 Rugby and Kenilworth
 St Albans
 Scarborough and Whitby
 Shipley
 Shrewsbury and Atcham
 Wellingborough
 Welwyn Hatfield
 Wimbledon
 The Wrekin

Labour to Liberal Democrat (11)

 Birmingham Yardley
 Bristol West
 Cambridge
 Cardiff Central
 East Dunbartonshire
 Falmouth and Camborne
 Hornsey and Wood Green
 Inverness, Nairn, Badenoch and Strathspey
 Leeds North West
 Manchester Withington
 Rochdale
Liberal Democrat to Conservative (5)
 Guildford
 Ludlow
 Newbury
 Torridge and West Devon
 Weston-Super-Mare
Conservative to Liberal Democrat (3)

 Solihull
 Taunton
 Westmorland and Lonsdale
Labour to SNP (2)
 Dundee East
 Na h-Eileanan an Iar
UUP to DUP (2)
 East Antrim
 South Antrim

Labour to Independent (1)

 Blaenau Gwent
Liberal Democrat to Labour (1)

 Leicester South

PC to Liberal Democrat (1)

 Ceredigion

UUP to SDLP (1)

Belfast South

Labour to Respect (1)

 Bethnal Green and Bow
SLDP to Sinn Fein (1)

 Newry and Armagh

Post-election events

Formation of government
Following the election, Labour remained in power with Tony Blair remaining as Prime Minister. The morning after the election, Blair travelled to Buckingham Palace to inform The Queen of the election result and to receive permission to form a government, consequently beginning his third term as Prime Minister. Blair reshuffled his Cabinet and junior ministers over the following weekend, with formal announcements made on 9 May 2005. The most senior positions of Chancellor, Home Secretary and Foreign Secretary remained the same (Gordon Brown, Charles Clarke and Jack Straw respectively), but a few new faces were added. Most notably, David Blunkett returned to cabinet as the Work and Pensions Secretary, although he was forced to resign again due to another scandal before the end of the year that spawned a national press and opposition campaign for his dismissal. Patricia Hewitt became the new Health Secretary, Tessa Jowell remained as Culture Secretary, whilst Alan Johnson was promoted to Trade and Industry Secretary. Meanwhile, Ruth Kelly retained the Education job and Margaret Beckett stayed put at Environment.

The new Parliament met on 11 May for the election of the Speaker of the House of Commons.

New party leaders
On 6 May, Michael Howard announced he would be standing down as leader of the Conservative Party, but not before a review of the leadership rules. The formal leadership election began in October, and was ultimately won by David Cameron. On 7 May, David Trimble resigned as leader of the Ulster Unionist Party; Sir Reg Empey was elected as his successor at an Ulster Unionist Council meeting on 24 June.

End of the term
Blair's successor as Prime Minister, Gordon Brown (who came to office on 27 June 2007), visited Buckingham Palace on 6 April 2010 and asked the Queen to dissolve Parliament on 12 April. The next election was held on 6 May 2010.

Further reading
 John Bartle and Anthony King, eds. Britain at the Polls 2005 (2005) excerpt and text search
 Andrew Geddes and Jonathan Tonge, eds. Britain decides: the UK general election 2005 (2005) 311 pages
 Dennis Kavanagh and David Butler, eds. The British General Election of 2005 (2006) essays by political scientists

See also

 List of MPs elected in the 2005 United Kingdom general election
 2005 United Kingdom general election in England
 2005 United Kingdom general election in Scotland
 2005 United Kingdom general election in Wales
 2005 United Kingdom general election in Northern Ireland
 List of MPs for constituencies in England (2005–2010)
 List of MPs for constituencies in Northern Ireland (2005–2010)
 List of MPs for constituencies in Scotland (2005–2010)
 List of MPs for constituencies in Wales (2005–2010)
 2005 United Kingdom local elections
 Results of the 2005 United Kingdom general election
 Results breakdown of the 2005 United Kingdom general election

References

External links
 
 NSD: European Election  * http://news.bbc.co.uk/nol/ifs_news/hi/uk_news/politics/vote_2005/default.stm Database – UK

Manifestos 
Main parties
 Are You Thinking What We're Thinking?, Conservative Party
 Britain forward, not back, Labour Party
 The REAL alternative, Liberal Democrats

Smaller parties which won seats
 Leadership That's Working, Democratic Unionist Party
 We can build a better Wales, Plaid Cymru
 Peace Justice Equality, Respect Party
 Let's Make Scotland Matter, Scottish National Party
 2005 Westminster Election Manifesto, Sinn Féin
 SDLP Manifesto 2005, Social Democratic and Labour Party
 Ulster Unionist Manifesto 2005, Ulster Unionist Party

Other parties
 Alliance Works: Working for You at Westminster, Alliance Party of Northern Ireland
 Rebuilding British Democracy, British National Party
 The Real Choice For Real Change, Green Party of England and Wales
 The 2005 Manifesto, Liberal Party
 People, Planet, Peace, Scottish Green Party
 SSP Manifesto 2005, Scottish Socialist Party
 Programme For A Socialist Britain, Socialist Labour Party
 We Want Our Country Back, UK Independence Party
 Manifesto General Election 2005, Veritas

 
2005

May 2005 events in the United Kingdom
Tony Blair